The Roaming Cowboy is a 1937 American Western film directed by Robert F. Hill and written by Fred Myton. The film stars Fred Scott, Al St. John, Lois January, Forrest Taylor, Roger Williams, Richard Cramer, Buddy Cox and Art Miles. The film was released on January 4, 1937, by Spectrum Pictures.

This was the first film to feature Al St. John as "Fuzzy" Jones, a cowboy comedy relief character who went on to appear in dozens of films, including the Producers Releasing Corporation's "Billy the Kid" series from 1940 to 1946, and their "Lone Rider" series from 1941 to 1943.

Plot

Cast          
Fred Scott as Cal Brent
Al St. John as Fuzzy Jones 
Lois January as Jeannie Morgan
Forrest Taylor as Evans
Roger Williams as Walton 
Richard Cramer as Dan Morgan 
Buddy Cox as Buddy Barry
Art Miles aa Blackie 
George Morrell aa Dad Barry
George Chesebro as Water Poisoner Henchman
Carl Mathews as Cowhand

References

External links
 

1937 films
1930s English-language films
American Western (genre) films
1937 Western (genre) films
Films directed by Robert F. Hill
American black-and-white films
1930s American films